Rhythm Drives Me Crazy is an electronica song performed by Swedish band BWO. The song was released as a second single from their third album, Fabricator in Sweden, on August 22, 2007.

Track list
Digital download; CD single:
 Rhythm Drives Me Crazy (radio edit) 3:50
 Rhythm Drives Me Crazy (Carl Ryden remix radio edit) 3:02
 Rhythm Drives Me Crazy (SoundFactory radio edit) 3:55
 Rhythm Drives Me Crazy (The Attic remix) 7:25
 Rhythm Drives Me Crazy (remix) 7:24
 Rhythm Drives Me Crazy (Carl Ryden remix) 6:08
 Rhythm Drives Me Crazy (SoundFactory Munich Machine mix) 8:24
 Rhythm Drives Me Crazy (SoundFactory Stockholm Syndrome mix) 7:53
 Rhythm Drives Me Crazy (Badd Lover remix) 5:46

2007 singles
BWO (band) songs
Songs written by Alexander Bard
2007 songs
Songs written by Anders Hansson (songwriter)
Songs written by Niklas Bergwall
Songs written by Niclas Kings
Capitol Records singles
EMI Music Sweden singles